Return Delos Torrey (March 24, 1835 – November 2, 1893) was an American miller from Oshkosh, Wisconsin who spent one two-year term (1877–1878) as a member of the Wisconsin State Senate from the 19th District (Winnebago County).

Torrey was born in Madison, Ohio. He moved to Fall River, Wisconsin in 1850, then to Neenah, Wisconsin in 1861. In 1871, Torrey moved to Oshkosh, Wisconsin. He served as county treasurer of Winnebago County, Wisconsin from 1871 to 1878. He died November 2, 1893 in Chicago, Illinois. He had lived in that city for about ten years, and had become active in its local politics.

References 

1835 births
1893 deaths
Millers
Politicians from Chicago
People from Madison, Ohio
Politicians from Oshkosh, Wisconsin
Republican Party Wisconsin state senators
19th-century American politicians
People from Neenah, Wisconsin
People from Fall River, Wisconsin